Thomas Rzeznizok (born 29 March 1957) is a German luger. He competed in the men's singles event at the 1984 Winter Olympics.

References

External links
 

1957 births
Living people
People from Unna (district)
Sportspeople from Arnsberg (region)
German male lugers
Olympic lugers of West Germany
Lugers at the 1984 Winter Olympics